Kolporter Kielce is a Polish women's handball team, based in Kielce.

See also
 Handball in Poland
 Sports in Poland

Polish handball clubs
Sport in Kielce